SSVg Velbert is a German association football club located in Velbert, North Rhine-Westphalia. The club was founded in 1902 as Velberter FC 02 and is the third oldest football club in the region.

History

Early predecessors
Several other predecessor sides figure in the club's history. In 1907 Ballspiel-Verein 07 Velbert was formed and this team enjoyed early success advancing rapidly through the ranks of the local football leagues. In 1914 it was joined by BV Olympia 06 Velbert. The gymnastics club Turner Velberter Turnvereins 1864 formed its own football department in 1912 and in 1919 VFC joined that group to form VFC 02, Spielabteilung des Velberter Turnvereins 1864 in a short-lived union that only lasted two years. The football department of 1864 itself became independent in 1921 to play as SSV Velbert 1912.

In 1933 VFC and BV 07 fused to form Verein für Bewegungspiele 02/07 Velbert and played in colours of green and white. The following season they finished second in their second-tier league, and the next year continued their strong play, winning sixteen consecutive matches. The onset of World War II led to a shortage of players and in 1941 the club was merged with SV Borussia Velbert 06 to form a wartime side that shortly suspended play as the conflict overtook the region.

Formation of the present day club
SSV and VfB both resumed play after the war and enjoyed a lively crosstown rivalry. Over time SSV emerged as the stronger side and by 1961 were playing third division football in the Amateurliga Niederrhein. Just three years later, in 1964, SSV and VfB agreed to a merger to form the present day club SSVg Velbert 02, playing in blue and white, with the goal of advancing to second division play.

They met their objective in 1969 when they were promoted to the Regionalliga West (II), but quickly fell away again to third division play after a 17th-place finish in their only season in tier II. A mid-1970s proposal to re-unite with wartime partner Borussia Velbert was abandoned.  Ultimately, SSVg found they could not support their ambition financially and began a steady descent to fifth and sixth division football in the 1990s.

Since 2000 the club has played in the Oberliga Nordrhein (IV).  They topped the standings in the 2003–04 season but were denied a license for Regionalliga play as not solid enough financially.  In 2003 the club also qualified for the German Cup and defeated 1. FSV Mainz 05 on penalties in the first round, but then succumbed to Jahn Regensburg in the second round.

In recent seasons, the team has continued to earn good results with consistent top-three finishes in their division. They have qualified for 2006–07 DFB-Pokal play and played SpVgg Unterhaching in the first round.

The club earned promotion to the tier four Regionalliga West in 2012 and played there for two seasons before being relegated to the Oberliga Niederrhein in 2014. After a single season in the Oberliga in 2014–15 the club returned to the Regionalliga after winning a league championship. Velbert finished 15th in the Regionalliga in 2015–16 and was relegated back to the Oberliga once more.

Honours
The club's honours:
 Lower Rhine Cup
 Winners: 2003, 2006
 Oberliga Nordrhein
 Champions: 2004
 Oberliga Niederrhein
 Champions: 2015
 Verbandsliga Niederrhein
 Champions: 1969, 2000
 Landesliga Niederrhein 1
 Champions: 1999

Current squad

Stadium
The SSVg plays its games in the Stadion Sonnenblume (capacity 6,000)

External links
Official team site
Abseits Guide to German Soccer

 
Football clubs in Germany
Football clubs in North Rhine-Westphalia
Association football clubs established in 1902
1902 establishments in Germany